Web of Make Believe: Death, Lies and the Internet is an anthology true crime docuseries, directed by Brian Knappenberger, released on Netflix on June 15, 2022. The series explores instances of digital misinformation and its consequences.

Summary 
Each episode presents an example of how the internet is used to cause harm and commit crimes. The people involved in the cases tell their struggles, mistakes and efforts to catch the perpetrators, and also how it affected their lives. After introducing the key characters in the case the episodes explain how the internet was used to commit the crimes.

Episodes

Season 1 (2021)

Reception 
On the review aggregation website Rotten Tomatoes, the series holds an 83% "Fresh" rating with an average rating of 6 out of 10 based on 6 reviews.

References

External links 
 
 

Documentaries about crime
True crime television series
English-language Netflix original programming
2020s American documentary television series
2022 American television series debuts
Documentary television series about crime in the United States
Netflix original documentary television series
Television series about serial killers
Non-fiction works about serial killers